The Saudi Arabian Handball Federation (SAHF) is the governing body of handball and beach handball in the Kingdom of Saudi Arabia. Founded in 1975, SAHF is affiliated to the International Handball Federation and Asian Handball Federation. SAHF is also affiliated to the Saudi Arabian Olympic Committee, West Asian Handball Federation and the Arab Handball Federation. It is based in Riyadh.

Competitions
 Saudi Handball League

National teams
 Saudi Arabia men's national handball team
 Saudi Arabia men's national junior handball team
 Saudi Arabia women's national handball team

Competitions hosted

International
 2022 IHF Men's Super Globe
 2021 IHF Men's Super Globe
 2019 IHF Super Globe

Continental
 2022 Asian Men's Handball Championship
 2020 Asian Men's Club League Handball Championship
 2012 Asian Men's Handball Championship
 2011 Asian Men's Club League Handball Championship
 2008 Asian Men's Club League Handball Championship

International medals

References

External links
 Official website (Only Arabic Language)
 Saudi Arabian Handball Federation at IHF site

Handball
 Handball in Saudi Arabia
 1975 establishments in Saudi Arabia
Sports organizations established in 1975
 Handball governing bodies